The Team normal hill/4 × 5 km event of the FIS Nordic World Ski Championships 2015 was held on 22 February 2015.

Results

Ski jumping
The ski jumping was started at 10:01, but was meant to start at 10:00 but the officials were late.

Cross-country skiing
The cross-country skiing was started at 16:00.

References

Team normal hill 4 x 5 km